Montay Desmond Humphrey (born December 4, 1978), known professionally as DJ Montay, is an American disc jockey, Diamond certified, Grammy Award-nominated record producer and songwriter, who has worked with artists such as Flo Rida, T-Pain, Akon, Future, and Migos. He has a producer credit on Flo Rida's "Low”, which was one of the most successful singles of the 2000s. DJ Montay has had his productions featured on films such as Step Up 3D, Stomp The Yard, and Norbit.

Career

DJ Montay first came to prominence in 2006 with the hit single "Walk It Out," produced for Unk. The song peaked at number one on the Billboard Hot R&B/Hip-Hop Songs chart. He also produced a remix, which featured Andre 3000, Unk, Jim Jones and Big Boi. Shortly after, he produced another hit "2 Step," the follow-up single from Unk's debut album "Beat’n Down Yo Block" distributed by Koch Entertainment. It reached the Billboard Top Ten, with the remix featuring appearances from artists such as T-Pain, Jim Jones and E-40.

In 2008, DJ Montay produced his number one smash hit "Low" by Flo Rida featuring T-Pain. "Low" was one of the year's biggest songs and earned DJ Montay two Grammy nominations. In 2009, he followed up with "Sugar" for Flo Rida featuring Wynter Gordon, which peaked at number 5 in the Billboard Hot 100; "Who the Fuck is that" by Dolla featuring Akon and T-Pain; "I’d Rather" for the Academy Award-winning group Three 6 Mafia; and "Creepin" by Chamillionaire featuring Ludacris.

DJ Montay is credited for "Foolish" by Shawty Lo, which reached 20 on the Billboard Radio Songs; "Money Can’t Buy" by Ne-Yo featuring Young Jeezy, which reached 41 on the Billboard Hot R&B/Hip-Hop Songs chart. Other songs include "Mainstream Ratchet" and "So We Can Live" from 2 Chainz's second studio album B.O.A.T.S. II: Me Time; T.I.'s "Can You Learn" from his "Trouble Man" album featuring R. Kelly "Twisted" by Gorilla Zoe featuring Lil Jon; “Oh Yeah” by Plies featuring Chris Brown; and "Everybody Drunk" from Ludacris's "Battle of the Sexes" album.

His most recent credits include “I Like Dat” by T-Pain featuring Kehlani, which peaked at 97 on the Billboard Hot 100, and Walk It Talk It by Migos featuring Drake, which reached also peaked at 10 on the Billboard Hot 100.

Discography

Singles produced

Awards and nominations

References

External links

African-American DJs
American record producers
Living people
1978 births
21st-century African-American people
20th-century African-American people